The Dennis A. Smyth House is a historic house within the Ogden Central Bench Historic District in Ogden, Utah, United States, that is individually listed on the National Register of Historic Places (NRHP).

Description
The house was built in 1889 for Ephraim H. Nye, and it was designed in the Second Empire, Exotic Revival and Romanesque Revival styles by architect S. T. Whitaker. It later belonged to Dennis A. Smyth, an immigrant from Ireland who became a prominent businessman and invited William Howard Taft, the 27th President of the United States, to the house. From 1948 to 1967, the house was a Roman Catholic convent, and it later became a private residence again. It was listed on the NRHP on February 11, 1982.

See also

 National Register of Historic Places listings in Weber County, Utah

References

External links

		
National Register of Historic Places in Weber County, Utah
Revival architecture in the United States
Second Empire architecture in Utah
Romanesque Revival architecture in Utah
Houses completed in 1889
1889 establishments in Utah Territory